The second season of the American television drama series House of Cards began filming a set of 13 episodes on April 29, 2013, and concluded on November 8. Filming occurred primarily in Baltimore. On December 4, 2013, Netflix announced that the season would be released in its entirety on February 14, 2014. Set in Washington, D.C., season two deals with topics such as entitlement reform, state-sponsored cyberespionage, money laundering in campaign finance, anthrax scares, sexual assault in the United States military, public opinion regarding abortion in the United States, parliamentary procedure of the United States Senate, and Federal government shutdowns. The plot picks back up where season one ends.

Critics previewed the first four episodes of the season under non-disclosure agreements not to reveal any spoilers. Reviews began appearing as early as January 31. Many critics who previewed the season noted the first episode was shocking, but withheld the surprises of the four episodes made available for preview. Willa Paskin of Slate broke the embargo nearly a day early revealing several spoilers. Whereas  critics had been somewhat split on the propriety of binge-watching the first season, they were more supportive of the practice for season two.

Early reviews were largely positive, noting that the second season had a darker tone than the first. Molly Parker was praised as an addition to the cast. Nonetheless, many critics were concerned at the domineering presence of Underwood, who appears to have no worthy adversaries. Viewership of the second season was many times higher than season one. The season earned thirteen Primetime Emmy Award nominations for the 66th Primetime Emmy Awards and three nominations at both the 72nd Golden Globe Awards and the 21st Screen Actors Guild Awards. Kevin Spacey won Golden Globe Award for Best Actor – Television Series Drama for playing Frank Underwood in season two. Season two of House of Cards was one of the first shows available in 4K video format on Netflix's streaming service.

Summary
Francis spends most of the season as the newly appointed Vice President of the United States. In early episodes Frank vanquishes reporters on the trail of a murder he committed in the previous season. However, the drama soon shifts to tensions involving Frank, President Walker, the Chinese government, and billionaire businessman Raymond Tusk, eventually culminating in a bitter political war between Frank and Tusk. Frank's wife Claire publicly reveals that she was raped in college by a prominent general and pursues anti-rape legislation. The most significant new character is Jackie Sharp, Frank's successor as House Whip, who soon finds herself embroiled in Frank's plans. As the war between Frank and Tusk consumes the Presidency, things culminate in a scandal that leads to Walker resigning, Tusk being arrested, and Frank ascending to the Oval Office.

Cast
Among the new cast members in season two are Molly Parker and Sam Page, while directors include Carl Franklin, Jodie Foster, James Foley, and Wright. The season features cameos by several notable journalists, including Ashleigh Banfield, Rachel Maddow, Chris Matthews, Matt Bai, Morley Safer, Sean Hannity, and Kelly O'Donnell.

 Kevin Spacey as Francis J. Underwood, the Vice President of the United States
 Robin Wright as Claire Underwood, the Second Lady of the United States
 Michael Kelly as Douglas "Doug" Stamper, the Chief of Staff to the Vice President of the United States
 Molly Parker as Jacqueline "Jackie" Sharp, a war veteran, Congresswoman from California and Underwood's successor as House Majority Whip
 Michel Gill as Garrett Walker, the 45th President of the United States
 Gerald McRaney as Raymond Tusk, a multi-billionaire businessman and investor who acts as an advisor and confidante to President Walker
 Nathan Darrow as Edward Meechum, Secret Service agent on Underwood's detail, a former member of the U.S. Capitol Police serving as Underwood's bodyguard and driver
 Mahershala Ali as Remy Danton, a lobbyist with law firm Glendon Hill and former employee of Frank Underwood
 Derek Cecil as Seth Grayson, a sinister political operative who becomes Press Secretary for Vice President Underwood
 Rachel Brosnahan as Rachel Posner, a former sex worker seeking a new life
 Sakina Jaffrey as Linda Vasquez, the White House Chief of Staff in the Walker Administration
 Jayne Atkinson as Catherine Durant, the U.S. Secretary of State in the Walker Administration
 Jimmi Simpson as Gavin Orsay, a hacker and informant for the FBI
 Joanna Going as Patricia Walker, wife of President Garrett Walker and First Lady of the United States
 Mozhan Marnò as Ayla Sayyad, a tenacious journalist working for the Wall Street Telegraph
 Jeremy Holm as Agent Nathan Green, the White House/FBI liaison
 Sebastian Arcelus as Lucas Goodwin, a senior political editor working at the Washington Herald
 Terry Chen as Xander Feng, a corrupt Chinese businessman and backchannel diplomat who is Raymond Tusk's business partner
 Libby Woodbridge as Megan Hennessey, a former U.S. Marine Private who was sexually assaulted by General Dalton McGinnis
 Kate Lyn Sheil as Lisa Williams, a social worker who befriends Rachel Posner
 Elizabeth Norment as Nancy Kaufberger, secretary of the office of the Democratic House Whip
 Gil Birmingham as Daniel Lanagin, a Native American casino owner in Missouri and friend of Raymond Tusk
 Reg E. Cathey as Freddy Hayes, friend of Frank Underwood and the owner of a BBQ restaurant that Frank frequently visits
 Samuel Page as Connor Ellis, a smooth talking media consultant who becomes Communications Director for Claire Underwood
 Larry Pine as Bob Birch, a Democratic Congressman from Michigan and the Speaker of the U.S. House of Representatives
 Kristen Connolly as Christina Gallagher, a headstrong aide to President Walker and former girlfriend of Peter Russo
 Curtiss Cook as Terry Womack, House Majority Leader from Missouri's 5th congressional district
 Constance Zimmer as Janine Skorsky, a veteran journalist working for news blog Slugline
 Michael Warner as Oliver Spence 
 Benito Martinez as Hector Mendoza, a Republican Senator from Arizona and the Senate Majority Leader
 Boris McGiver as Tom Hammerschmidt, former chief editor of the Washington Herald
 David Clennon as Ted Havermeyer, a veteran Congressman from California and PAC Chairman who is a mentor to Congresswoman Sharp
 Elizabeth Marvel as Heather Dunbar, an uncompromising lawyer who is appointed Special Prosecutor in the investigation into money laundering of foreign money via PACs
 Tom Galantich as Reverend Thomas Larkin, a minister and relationship therapist
 Mark Zeisler as Bill Gallich, the White House Counsel
 Reed Birney as Donald Blythe, a Democratic Congressman from New Hampshire
 Sandrine Holt as Gillian Cole
 Ben Daniels as Adam Galloway, a world-renowned photographer and former lover of Claire Underwood
 Kate Mara as Zoe Barnes, an ambitious journalist working for news blog Slugline and former lover of Frank Underwood

Episodes

Background
The second season was made available in its entirety on February 14, 2014 (Valentine's Day) at 12:01 a.m. PT. Prior to the release of season 1, three reviewers, Hank Stuever of The Washington Post, Nancy deWolf Smith of The Wall Street Journal, and Alessandra Stanley of The New York Times, commented on possible binge viewing by Netflix customers. Stanley notes that the show "is probably seen best one episode at a time. It's a delicious immorality play with an excellent cast, but the tempo is slow and oddly ponderous—a romp slowed down to a dirge". Smith also notes that due to its "relentless theme", "House of Cards might go down better in smaller portions and thus be enjoyably prolonged", deriding potential binge watchers as people who liken a delicacy to a "bag of M&M's". However, Stuever disagreed about season 1 saying "So, on the iffy chance that House of Cards draws you in and you simply cannot stop watching, then, yes, you may power-binge your way through all 13 hours at once". Upon viewing the four episode season 2 preview Time James Poniewozik says "I could easily see powering through the season in a free weekend, precisely because no individual episode needs much time to sink in". Stanley also felt the second season was "binge-worthy" upon viewing the preview. However, Ellen Gray of Philly.com supports not binge-watching the season, as she believes it does not serve it well.

Production

Writing

In interviews during the writing and filming of season 2 showrunner Beau Willimon said he had drawn inspiration for the series from a variety of sources including Robert Caro's The Years of Lyndon Johnson and Jeremy Larner's Nobody Knows. Lyndon B. Johnson was a repeated source for themes and issues. Willimon also commented on the fictional world of politics that the show represented: "It's a rough-and-tumble game whenever power is involved—people's ambitions, their desires, their competitive spirit will often push them to play outside the rules." Willimon noted that "I don't think about topping things ... The evolution of character is not a game of one-upmanship. It is about change. Souls are vast and so the opportunity to explore ways in which characters contradict themselves and evolve is also vast" and that season 2 provided the opportunity "to expand the world and more deeply explore the characters".

For Spacey, the portrayal of Underwood for a second season was a learning process. "There is so much I don't know about Francis, so much that I'm learning ... I've always thought that the profession closest to that of an actor is being a detective ... We are given clues by writers, sometimes clues they're aware of and sometimes not. Then you lay them all out and try to make them come alive as a character who's complex and surprising, maybe even to yourself". Gerald McRaney spoke about his expanded role by saying that whereas in season 1 the challenge to playing his character, Raymond Tusk, was in "having to learn Mandarin", in season 2 his character has become "somebody who you don't know which color hat he's wearing".

Filming
Netflix had ordered two seasons of 13 episodes when it made its original commitment to the series in 2011. According to Governor of Maryland Martin O'Malley, production of the first season brought $140 million in the form of 2,200 jobs and transactions with 1,800 vendors to the Baltimore metropolitan area economy and the Maryland General Assembly expanded its Film Production Tax Credit so that season two could have similar impact over the course of 150 days of filming. Like the first season, the second season was largely filmed in the Baltimore area. Although production was publicized as being in Baltimore, Season 1 had based production in Harford County, Maryland, and season 2 also had its production office in Edgewood and a Joppa sound stage. The April 27, 2013 White House Correspondents Dinner spoofed House of Cards from the Maryland set prior to the beginning of the filming of season 2. Filming began on Monday April 29, 2013, which was just a few weeks later in the year than season 1 had started. On May 14, O'Malley visited the set to publicize the success of the tax incentives.

During spring and summer 2013, the show hosted several large casting calls some of which had over 1000 hopefuls. On June 13, crews began preparing the State House for filming on June 17 and 18. The Maryland State House is not available for rent so the producers made donations to various organizations. The show filmed in Annapolis at the Maryland House of Delegates and the wife of House Speaker Michael E. Busch, Cynthia, was cast as an extra. She played a United States senator as the set depicted the United States Senate chamber. The scenes were used as part of "Chapter 16" (season 2, episode 3). On July 24, the show announced that it would film at the Baltimore County Circuit Courthouses in Towson, Maryland on July 31. The filming occurred at this location on August 7.

On August 3, House of Cards was going to film a presidential motorcade at the National Mall in Washington, D.C. at 3 PM. However, Chief of police Cathy L. Lanier of the Metropolitan Police Department of the District of Columbia (MPD) revoked the permits that morning. An MPD spokesperson explained "The Metropolitan Police Department is not the lead agency on presidential motorcades and we did not want to portray ourselves as such". As a result, the production crews did a last minute filming of the desired scenes back in Baltimore. The next day, Mayor of the District of Columbia Vincent Gray stated that there was confusion on what role the MPD would play in the filming. A spokesperson from his office stated that ""MPD is not going to rent itself out as extras for film ... That's what MPD's decision was focused on. We're not going to be actors." On October 2, all issues were resolved and the motorcade was filmed as originally planned without any MPD personnel "actively participate in the filming".

In August, several areas in Harford County were used for filming season 2, including areas in Bel Air and Edgewood. Havre de Grace had been used in season 1 to depict Underwood's home district in South Carolina. The Liriodendron mansion was the scene of filming on August 12 and 13. Bel Air police were paid $1550 for August 13 duties at another filming location.

Although there were reports that the filming was largely completed by October 1, Willimon tweeted on that date that he had just finished writing the season finale. Willimon and others tweeted that filming was completed on November 8. The following week, House of Cards workers got involved in the Typhoon Haiyan relief efforts.

According to an October 10 story in The Huffington Post, executive producer Rick Cleveland stated that he believed that season 2 would be the final season because both Spacey and Wright prefer to act in movies than in television. However, Willimon remained optimistic that the show will continue. The Baltimore Sun reporter, David Zurawik contested the journalistic process of The Huffington Post report because he says Modi Wiczyk, CEO of Media Rights Capital, the company that produces House of Cards, told him "I would basically be shocked if there wasn't [a season 3, 4 and 5]". A few weeks later, Netflix's Chief Content Officer Ted Sarandos confirmed that Netflix had an earnest interest in continuing House of Cards beyond its second season.

Post-production
On December 4, 2013, Netflix announced that the 13-episode season would be released in its entirety on February 14, 2014. Along with the scheduling announcement, Netflix confirmed that Francis (now Vice President) and Claire would "continue their ruthless rise to power as threats mount on all fronts". After season 1 received four nominations for the 71st Golden Globe Awards on December 12, a season 2 trailer was released on December 13. However, the first official full trailer was released on January 6.

Willimon has stated "In conception of the second season, I put a lot of thought into the doors open to us in seasons three and beyond ... I didn't want to paint ourselves into a corner in the second season." On February 4, 2014, Netflix announced it had renewed the web series for a season 3 of undisclosed length. In May 2014, the season became one of the first Netflix streaming offerings available in 4K video format.

Reception

Critical reception
The season was generally well received. The review aggregator Metacritic gave the season a score of 80 out of 100, based on 25 critics. Another review aggregator, Rotten Tomatoes gave the season a rating of 88%, based on 42 reviews, with an average rating of 8/10. The site's critical consensus reads, "House of Cards proves just as bingeworthy in its second season, with more of the strong performances, writing, and visual design that made the first season so addictive."

James Poniewozik of Time says "It is the same show you saw last season, the same weaknesses and strengths intact, but, as it makes clear before the first hour is over, every bit as brutal and sanguinary." According to Sara Smith of The Kansas City Star, "The shock and delight of the showy storytelling ... has faded a bit". Smith says that Barnes, Skorsky, and Goodwin's "investigation sucks them down a rabbit hole into a surreal underworld no sane reporter would explore". Regarding Frank, Smith says "A show can successfully revolve around one man, but a flawless winning streak gets monotonous" and that "it's time for someone to take Frank down a notch".

Willmore says that since characters have been introduced, "season two of House of Cards begins in a fashion that's far more free and quick-paced" than season 1. Willmore also notes that, "If season one slowly grew blacker in tone as it went from serious games of power and manipulation to life-and-death ones, season two starts off there and looks to only get darker in content." However, she stated that season 2 appeared to be lighter than season 1: "delivered with more of a wink by Frank than before. It may be darker, but it's also less heavy".

Stanley praises the series saying "It's not clear exactly why this bleak series is so exhilarating and binge-worthy. It could be that just as victims of tragedy find it hard to accept that their suffering is random and purposeless, voters find it intolerable that so many of the petty, shortsighted moves by elected officials have no greater meaning than small-time expediency." She also notes that the series "is more cynical than The Americans on FX and more pessimistic about human nature than The Walking Dead on AMC". However, The Americans "is more complex and inventive" according to Stanley who concurs that season 2 is darker but notes it is more compelling than season 1.  Stuever compares the show unfavorably to both Veep for its "bumbling chaos and ego implosions" over House of Cards "prohibitively sinister" execution and The Good Wife for its superior delivery of "nastiness and self-interest in power plays".

Many critics criticized the lack of reasonable challenge for the Underwoods. James Poniewozik notes that "Francis needs a stronger nemesis, if not for the sake of justice then for the sake of excitement. And House of Cards would be a greater show if it had characters who were people more than game pieces. Still, on its limited terms, it's absorbing to watch". According to Entertainment Weekly Karen Valby, the show's fundamental problem is that "The Underwoods have no worthy opponents." According to Variety Brian Lowry, as conniving as Underwood is, it is unfathomable that "nobody else in a town built on power seems particularly adept at recognizing this or combating him". Valby notes that neither Tusk nor Goodwin is an effective foe, leaving the audience longing for a comeuppance in the first four episodes that served as a preview for critics and his hopeful that Sharp provides a good foil as the season progresses. He also wrote that House of Cards overplays its depiction of the edginess of "Washington being venal and corrupt". He describes the show as a "mixed bag". 

Tim Goodman of The Hollywood Reporter describes the preview of the season by saying "It's entertaining and cruises along with a strong pulse. There's a core mystery and American politics is mocked, appropriately, for being a two-party hustle of recrimination and separatism." Goodman notes that writer Beau Willimon has Frank "pontificate to the point of spouting cliches from time to time" and Frank's "conniving wins too often". Goodman sums things up by saying "There's a heavier hand than is necessary at times" and "House of Cards needs to stay more focused to be successful." 

Chuck Barney of the San Jose Mercury News had a more mixed response, noting that the preview episodes show that the series is as "handsomely crafted and marvelously acted as ever" but the episodes don't "provoke the same kind of adrenaline rush as last season". Barney was also impressed with newcomer Parker: "She's an agile actress who can deliver a sense of soft-spoken warmth but also a steely fierceness that comes with an underlying message: 'Underestimate me at your own peril.'"

The addition of Parker was well received among critics. Stanley notes that as Underwood's "protégée and, like everyone else in his poisoned orbit, soon discovers that Underwood expects his people to cast aside principle and pursue his grand plan." Valby describes her performance as one "played with throbbing edge". Goodman notes she serves to somewhat counterbalance Frank.

Verne Gay of Newsday notes that "Spacey's Underwood is even more sinuous, more complex, more treacherous and so—as a result—is the deeply pleasurable show that surrounds him."

Awards

On July 10, 2014, House of Cards earned thirteen Primetime Emmy Award nominations for the 66th Primetime Emmy Awards. Among its nominations were Outstanding Drama Series, Outstanding Lead Actor in a Drama Series for Kevin Spacey, Outstanding Lead Actress in a Drama Series for Robin Wright, Outstanding Writing for a Drama Series for Beau Willimon and Outstanding Directing for a Drama Series for Carl Franklin. The second season was also nominated for several 66th Primetime Creative Arts Emmy Awards, including Kate Mara for Outstanding Guest Actress in a Drama Series and Reg E. Cathey for Outstanding Guest Actor in a Drama Series. Other Creative Arts nominations were received for Casting, Cinematography, Picture Editing, Music Composition, Sound Mixing, and Art Direction.

Other recognitions included a TCA Award for Outstanding Achievement in Drama nomination at the 30th TCA Awards and the Critics' Choice Television Award for Best Actress in a Drama Series for Wright at the 4th Critics' Choice Television Awards. For the 67th Writers Guild of America Awards, the series was nominated for Best Drama Series. For the 21st Screen Actors Guild Awards, the cast was nominated for Best Drama Ensemble, Spacey won for Best Drama Actor, and Wright was nominated for Best Drama Actress. For the 72nd Golden Globe Awards, the series was nominated for Best Television Series – Drama, Wright was nominated for Best Actress – Television Series Drama, and Spacey won for Best Actor – Television Series Drama. For the 67th Directors Guild of America Awards, Jodie Foster was nominated for Outstanding Directing – Drama Series for the episode "Chapter 22".

Impact
U.S. President Barack Obama quipped about his interest in an advance copy of the second series: "I wish things were that ruthlessly efficient ... It's true. I was looking at Kevin Spacey thinking, 'this guy's getting a lot of stuff done'." The evening before the season was posted, someone responsible for the @BarackObama Twitter account (which is run by Organizing for Action) tweeted a request that no spoilers be posted online. Since the season debuted on Valentine's Day, The New York Observer created themed cards in honor of the series with quotes such as "A great man once said everything is about sex. Except sex. Sex is about power" (an Oscar Wilde quote Underwood had stated during season 1).

Whereas less than 2% of Netflix subscribers streamed season 1 during the first weekend last year, over 15% streamed at least one hour during the business day on February 14.

Home media

References

External links

House of Cards season 2 at Rotten Tomatoes

2014 American television seasons
House of Cards (American TV series) seasons